The Dimick Peaks are two peaks, the highest rising to , at the south side of the mouth of Dale Glacier in Victoria Land. They were named by the Advisory Committee on Antarctic Names in 1994 after Dorothy Dimick, a United States Geological Survey cartographer who was an Antarctic specialist in the Branch of Special Maps, 1944–76.

References 

Mountains of Victoria Land
Scott Coast